Sir Nicholas Waite (died ) was an English governor of Bombay during the period of the East India Company.

Waite assumed the office of Governor of Bombay on 17 November 1704 and left office in September 1708.
 
He died about 1715.

References

Governors of Bombay
Year of birth missing
Year of death missing